Zéphyrin Camélinat (variously spelled Zéphirin, Zéphyrenne; Mailly-la-Ville, Yonne, 5 March 1840Paris, 14 September 1932) was a French politician, writer, communard, socialist and communist.

Biography 

Zéphyrin Rémy Camélinat was born into a poor peasant family and became a metal worker by trade. He was a friend of the anarchist writer and social critic P.-J. Proudhon. In 1864, Camélinat was one of the signatories of the 'Manifesto of the Sixty', together with Henri Tolain and other Proudhonists. It abandoned political abstentionism and called for elections of workers to the National Assembly, and for the establishment of economic as well as political democracy.

Camélinat was instrumental in organising the French section of the First International and recruited Benoît Malon, among others. In 1871 Camélinat participated in the Paris Commune, serving as its treasurer. After the suppression of the Commune, he fled to England, where he remained until a general amnesty enabled him to return to France in 1880. From 1885 to 1889 he was a Socialist deputy in the Chamber of Deputies.
Soon after the 1885 session opened Antide Boyer, Émile Basly, Camélinat and others formed the "workers' group", a small socialist group independent of the extreme left.
The members of the workers' group summarized their demands in a manifesto on 12 March 1886:

Camélinat defended compensation for work accidents, social assistance for the disabled, limiting child labor, separation of church and state and free justice. He was involved in the unification of the French Socialist party (SFIO) in 1905.

During the First World War, Camélinat moved increasingly to the left of the Socialist Party and came to oppose its pro-war stance. In 1920 he became a founding member of the new French Communist Party (PCF), serving as its first presidential candidate in the French presidential election of 1924.

Camélinat died on 14 September 1931, aged 91. His funeral was organized by FCP and according to L'Humanité, it was attending by over 120,000 workers.

References

Sources

Bruno Fuligni, La France rouge. Un siècle d’histoire dans les archives du PCF, Les Arènes, 2011

The Great Soviet Encyclopedia. Moscow, 1979.

Members of the International Workingmen's Association
Communards
French socialists
French communists
1840 births
1932 deaths